Now That's What I Call a No.1 is a triple-disc compilation album that was released in the United Kingdom on 9 July 2012. It includes 60 number ones from the past 60 years and was released in celebration of the 60th anniversary of the Official Charts.

Track listing

CD 1
Adele, "Someone like You"
George Michael, "Careless Whisper"
Robbie Williams, "She's the One"
Take That, "Patience"
Wet Wet Wet, "Love Is All Around"
Celine Dion, "My Heart Will Go On"
Boyzone, "No Matter What"
Gnarls Barkley, "Crazy"
All Saints, "Never Ever"
Hear'say, "Pure and Simple"
Britney Spears, "...Baby One More Time"
Spice Girls, "Wannabe"
Steps, "Tragedy"
Blondie, "Heart of Glass"
ABBA, "Dancing Queen"
Gloria Gaynor, "I Will Survive"
Black Box, "Ride On Time"
Pet Shop Boys, "West End Girls"
The Human League, "Don't You Want Me"
Tony Christie, "(Is This the Way To) Amarillo"

CD 2
Rihanna featuring Jay-Z, "Umbrella"
Gotye featuring Kimbra, "Somebody That I Used to Know"
Bruno Mars, "Just the Way You Are"
Katy Perry featuring Snoop Dogg, "California Gurls"
Olly Murs, "Dance with Me Tonight"
David Guetta featuring Sia, "Titanium"
DJ Fresh featuring Rita Ora, "Hot Right Now"
Cheryl Cole, "Fight for This Love"
Jessie J, "Domino"
Lady Gaga, "Poker Face"
Tinie Tempah featuring Labrinth, "Pass Out"
Shaggy featuring Ricardo "RikRok" Ducent, "It Wasn't Me"
Coolio featuring L.V., "Gangsta's Paradise"
The Fugees, "Killing Me Softly"
The Black Eyed Peas, "I Gotta Feeling"
Kylie Minogue, "Can't Get You Out of My Head"
R. Kelly, "I Believe I Can Fly"
Oasis, "Don't Look Back in Anger"
The Verve, "The Drugs Don't Work"
Coldplay, "Paradise"

CD 3
Billy Joel, "Uptown Girl"
The Beach Boys, "Good Vibrations"
Elvis Presley, "Jailhouse Rock"
David Bowie, "Let's Dance"
Marvin Gaye, "I Heard It Through the Grapevine"
Rod Stewart, "Maggie May"
10cc, "I'm Not in Love"
The Righteous Brothers, "Unchained Melody"
Culture Club, "Do You Really Want to Hurt Me"
Soft Cell, "Tainted Love"
Dexys Midnight Runners, "Come On Eileen"
The Jam, "Going Underground"
Ian Dury and the Blockheads, "Hit Me with Your Rhythm Stick"
Adam & The Ants, "Stand and Deliver"
Sinéad O'Connor, "Nothing Compares 2 U"
Kate Bush, "Wuthering Heights"
The Animals, "The House of the Rising Sun"
Procol Harum, "A Whiter Shade of Pale"
Simon & Garfunkel, "Bridge over Troubled Water"
Louis Armstrong, "What a Wonderful World"

Charts

Release history

References

2012 compilation albums
Number 1
Sony Music compilation albums
EMI Records compilation albums
Universal Music Group compilation albums
Warner Music Group compilation albums